Medium-chain triglycerides (MCTs) are triglycerides with two or three fatty acids having an aliphatic tail of 6–12 carbon atoms, i.e. medium-chain fatty acids (MCFAs). Rich food sources for commercial extraction of MCTs include palm kernel oil and coconut oil.

Sources of MCTs
MCTs are found in palm kernel oil and coconut oil and can be separated by fractionation.
They can also be produced by interesterification.  Retail MCT powder is MCT oil embedded in starch and thus contains carbohydrates in addition to fats.  It is manufactured by spray drying.

List of MCFAs 

With regard to MCFAs, apart from the above listed straight chain (unbranched chain) fatty acids, side chain (branched chain) fatty acids also exist.

Applications

Calorie restriction 
A 2020 systematic review and meta-analysis by Critical Reviews in Food Science and Nutrition supported evidence that MCT decreases subsequent energy intake, but does not appear to affect appetite.

Dietary relevance 
Molecular weight analysis of milk from different species showed that while milk fats from all studied species were primarily composed of long-chain fatty acids (16 and 18 carbons long), approximately 10–20% of the fatty acids in milk from horses, cows, sheep, and goats were medium-chain fatty acids.

Some studies have shown that MCTs can help in the process of excess calorie burning, thus weight loss. MCTs are also seen as promoting fat oxidation and reduced food intake. MCTs have been recommended by some endurance athletes and the bodybuilding community. While health benefits from MCTs seem to occur, a link to improved exercise performance is inconclusive. A number of studies back the use of MCT oil as a weight loss supplement, but these claims are not without conflict, as about an equal number found inconclusive results.

Pharma relevance

MCTs can be used in solutions, liquid suspensions and lipid-based drug delivery systems for emulsions, self-emulsifying drug delivery systems, creams, ointments, gels and foams as well as suppositories. MCTs are also suitable for use as solvent and liquid oily lubricant in soft gels.  Brand names of pharma-grade MCT include Kollisolv MCT 70.

Medical relevance 
MCTs passively diffuse from the GI tract to the portal system (longer fatty acids are absorbed into the lymphatic system) without requirement for modification like long-chain fatty acids or very-long-chain fatty acids. In addition, MCTs do not require bile salts for digestion. Patients who have malnutrition, malabsorption or particular fatty-acid metabolism disorders are treated with MCTs because MCTs do not require energy for absorption, use, or storage.

Medium-chain triglycerides are generally considered a good biologically inert source of energy that the human body finds reasonably easy to metabolize. They have potentially beneficial attributes in protein metabolism, but may be contraindicated in some situations due to a reported tendency to induce ketogenesis and metabolic acidosis.  However, there is other evidence demonstrating no risk of ketoacidosis or ketonemia with MCTs at levels associated with normal consumption, and that the moderately elevated blood ketones can be an effective treatment for epilepsy.

Due to their ability to be absorbed rapidly by the body, medium-chain triglycerides have found use in the treatment of a variety of malabsorption ailments.  MCT supplementation with a low-fat diet has been described as the cornerstone of treatment for Waldmann disease. MCTs are an ingredient in some specialised parenteral nutritional emulsions in some countries.  Studies have also shown promising results for epilepsy through the use of ketogenic dieting.

Technical uses 
MCTs are bland compared to other fats and do not generate off-notes (dissonant tastes) as quickly as LCTs.  They are also more polar than LCTs.  Because of these attributes, they are widely used as carrier oils or solvents for flavours and oral medicines and vitamins.

See also 

 List of carboxylic acids
 Ketogenic diet
 List of saturated fatty acids

References

Further reading 

 
 
 
 
 
 
 

Triglycerides
Medical food